Abebe Mekonnen (born 23 September 1940) is an Ethiopian boxer. He competed in the men's lightweight event at the 1964 Summer Olympics.

References

External links
 

1940 births
Living people
Ethiopian male boxers
Olympic boxers of Ethiopia
Boxers at the 1964 Summer Olympics
Place of birth missing (living people)
Lightweight boxers